Pronuba is a genus of beetles in the family Cerambycidae, containing the following species:

 Pronuba decora Thomson, 1860
 Pronuba dorilis (Bates, 1867)
 Pronuba gracilis Hovore & Giesbert, 1990
 Pronuba incognita Hovore & Giesbert, 1990
 Pronuba lenkoi Monné & Martins, 1974

References

Eburiini
Cerambycidae genera